Štulac may refer to:

 Štulac (Lebane), a village in Serbia
 Štulac (Vrnjačka Banja), a village in Serbia
 Leo Štulac (born 1994), Slovenian footballer